"Cut the Cord" is a song by American rock band Shinedown. It was released on June 29, 2015 as the lead single from the band's fifth studio album, Threat to Survival. The song reached No. 1 on the Billboard Mainstream Rock chart, their ninth single to do so. It was featured as the official theme song of WWE’s Hell in a Cell (2015).

Release
The song was released on June 29, 2015 as an audio clip and single, and its accompanying music video was released the following day.

Song meaning
Through a post on the band's Facebook page, vocalist Brent Smith described "Cut the Cord" as "the statement to the world that you will not give up, you will not give in, and you refuse to fail." In an interview with the American magazine Billboard, Smith said the song was "brutally honest and unapologetic." He also described it as essentially "a wake-up call reminding us all that we can control our own destiny by finding the courage and tenacity to destroy whatever it is that's holding us back."

Track listing
"Cut the Cord"
"Black Cadillac"

Charts

Weekly charts

Year-end charts

Certifications

References

2015 singles
2015 songs
Shinedown songs
Songs written by Brent Smith
Atlantic Records singles
Songs written by Eric Bass